The Wan Chien (Tâi-lô: bān-kiàm) is an air to ground cruise missile developed and produced by the National Chung-Shan Institute of Science and Technology (NCSIST) of Taiwan.

Design and development
It partly resembles the AGM-154 Joint Standoff Weapon and the Storm Shadow. Serial production was expected to start in 2015. Full operational capability was declared in 2018. It is functional in both a ground strike role and a naval strike role. The codename for the development and initial production of the Wan Chien was "Project God’s Axe" (神斧).

After the completion of initial production NCSIST began working on a long range variant with a 400km range.

Service history 
The Wan Chien entered service in 2011. The primary launch platform is the AIDC F-CK-1 C/D.

General characteristics 
 Platform: Aircraft launched
 Engine: Turbine
 Range: 200 km, 240km
 Guidance: GPS enabled

See also 
 HF-2
 AGM-158 JASSM
 Storm Shadow
 Hatf-VIII (Ra'ad)

References

Air-to-surface missiles
Cruise missiles of the Republic of China
Anti-ship cruise missiles of the Republic of China
Weapons and ammunition introduced in 2011